The United States Penitentiary, Florence High (USP Florence High) is a high-security United States federal prison for male inmates in Colorado. It is operated by the Federal Bureau of Prisons, a division of the United States Department of Justice. It is named "Florence High" in order to differentiate it from the United States Penitentiary, Florence ADMAX, the federal supermax prison located in the same complex.

History
USP Florence High was built in 1993 in response to the growing need for a place to house high-security federal inmates. It was designed by DLR Group, an architectural firm specializing in correctional facilities. Before the complex was built, the city of Florence was experiencing an economic crisis with an unemployment rate of 17%. When the citizens were polled by mail about building the complex in Florence, 97% of respondents were in favor of the project. It was estimated that the Florence Federal Correctional Complex was going to provide about 1,000 temporary jobs and 900 permanent jobs. In anticipation of these jobs the community raised $160,000 to purchase the  needed to build the prisons.

Facility
A perimeter fence, seven guard towers, and a patrol road ensure the security of the prison. The prison includes health services, educational program areas, visitation, laundry, a barbershop, commissary, chapel, Special Housing Unit (SHU), and an exercise area. The prison also contains a step-down unit for inmates of ADX Florence. Inmates will still spend roughly 22 hours of their day in their cells; however, they are kept in a less restrictive environment in which interaction among inmates is acceptable and encouraged. From there, they will either be transferred to the general population unit in Florence High or to a different federal prison.

Notable incidents
In 2000, seven federal correctional officers whom the union called "The Cowboys" were charged with committing misconduct which occurred between January 1995 and July 1997, which included beating and choking handcuffed inmates, mixing waste into the inmates' food, and threatening other officers who objected to their actions. The case went to trial in 2003, and three of the officers, Mike Lavallee, Rod Schultz, and Robert Verbickas, were convicted of violating the civil rights of inmate Pedro Castillo by beating him while he was in restraints. Lavallee and Schultz were also convicted of engaging in a conspiracy to commit civil rights violations. All three were sentenced to prison terms.

1999 inmate murder
On October 10, 1999, inmates William Concepcion Sablan and Rudy Cabrera Sablan were accused of the murder of fellow inmate Joey Jesus Estrella. The three inmates were seen drinking "hooch" together, and they were heard fighting throughout the night. Both William and Rudy Sablan were found with the disembowled corpse of Estrella in their cell the next morning. Prosecutors intended to seek the death penalty against both William and Rudy Sablan, who are cousins; however, due to William Sablan's extensive record of mental illness and brain damage, they were both given life sentences for the murder and moved into ADX Florence. Today William Sablan is housed at USP Allenwood and Rudy Sablan is housed at USP Hazleton.

2008 inmate murder
In 2008, inmate Gary Douglas Watland, who was serving a combined 55-year state sentence for the murder of a friend and attempting to escape the Maine State Prison, was accused of killing fellow inmate Mark Baker, a member of the Nazi Lowriders gang. Watland sneaked up on Baker while he was playing poker and stabbed him in the neck with a homemade knife. Watland stated the attack was a "kill or be killed situation", as he had recently come out of the closet in prison. Baker's gang was known to attack homosexuals in prison. Watland subsequently accepted a plea deal and was sentenced to life imprisonment. He is currently serving his sentence at ADX Florence.

2008 inmate riot
On April 20, 2008 a 30-minute riot occurred between a large number of inmates in the recreation yard, during which several inmates were stabbed with homemade knives known as "shanks." Correction officers who were posted on watch towers shot and killed two of the armed inmates. The incident began after white supremacist prisoners celebrating Adolf Hitler’s birthday began yelling racial epithets at black prisoners. The white supremacists were drinking hooch, a form of homemade wine, and were armed with rocks and improvised weapons. Approximately 200 prisoners were involved in the melee.

2021 inmate murder 
On December 6, 2021, inmate Jamarr Thompson, 33, was killed after he was involved in an altercation with another inmate. Thompson was serving a 63-month sentence for an attempted bank robbery. This was the third murder in a Federal Bureau of Prisons (BOP) institution in the past one month, the other two occurring at USP Canaan and USP Tucson, respectively. This incident heightened concerns about the rising level of violence within BOP prisons. It also intensified chairman of the Senate Judiciary Committee, Senator Dick Durbin's request to the Attorney General to fire BOP chairman Michael Carvajal, citing failure to respond adequately to rising levels of violence within federal prisons and corruption among BOP staff.

Notable inmates (current and former)

See also

List of U.S. federal prisons
Federal Bureau of Prisons
Incarceration in the United States

References

External links
 USP Florence High

Buildings and structures in Fremont County, Colorado
Florence High
Prisons in Colorado
1993 establishments in Colorado
Prison uprisings in the United States